Moroeni, also spelled Moroieni, is a commune in Dâmbovița County, Muntenia, Romania. It is composed of six villages: Dobrești, Glod, Lunca, Moroeni, Mușcel, and Pucheni.

The commune is located at the northern extremity of the county, covering the southern end of the Bucegi Mountains. The Ialomița River, which has its source just north of Moroeni, flows through it.

References

Communes in Dâmbovița County
Localities in Muntenia